Coprinellus heptemerus is a species of mushroom in the family Psathyrellaceae. It was first described as Coprinus heptemerus by mycologists M. Lange and Alexander H. Smith in 1952, and later transferred to the genus Coprinellus in 2001. It is a coprophilous fungus and it is known to occur on the dung of goats and possibly on that of sheep.

References

heptemerus
Fungi described in 1952
Fungi of Greece